Leyla Neyzi (born July 29, 1961) is a Turkish academic (anthropologist/sociologist/historian) who is currently working in Sabancı University, Istanbul.

Biography 
Leyla Neyzi was born in Istanbul, Turkey, the daughter of Ali H. Neyzi, a businessman and writer, and Olcay Neyzi, a pediatrician. After graduating from Robert College of Istanbul, she studied Anthropology at Stanford University (BA 1982) and Development Sociology at Cornell University (PhD 1991). She worked as an assistant professor at Boğaziçi University, (1992–1994) and as the Oral History Project Director, Economic and Social History Foundation (1995–1996). She currently teaches Anthropology at Sabancı University.

Leyla Neyzi produced a notable series of studies based on the diaries of Yaşar Paker, who issued from the tiny Jewish community of early 20th century Ankara, and who was twice enrolled in the labor battalions in Turkey, the first time during the Greco-Turkish War (1919-1922) and the second time during the Second World War (in which Turkey did not take part). One of these studies was published in Jewish Social Studies in Fall 2005

Awards 
Malcolm H. Kerr Dissertation Award, Middle East Studies Association of North America, 1992.
Research Award, Population Council Middle East Awards Program, 1998–1999 (Family History, Generation and Identity in Turkey).
Research Award, Sabancı University, 2003–2004, (An Oral History of the Neighborhood of Teşvikiye).
Visiting Scholar, Oxford University Programme on Contemporary Turkey and St. Antony's College, Senior Associate Member, 2004.

References

External links
Personal page in Sabancı University web site
Where Traditional and Modern Meet and Sashay Along

20th-century Turkish historians
Academic staff of Sabancı University
Turkish women historians
Turkish anthropologists
Turkish women anthropologists
Turkish sociologists
Turkish women sociologists
Turkish women academics
1961 births
Living people
Stanford University alumni
Cornell University alumni
Robert College alumni
21st-century Turkish historians